Makes You Wanna is an album by Pieces of a Dream issued in 1988 on Manhattan Records. The album reached No. 24 on the Billboard Contemporary Jazz Albums chart.

Tracklisting

References

1988 albums
Manhattan Records albums